Delaney-Edwards House is a historic inn in Salem, Oregon. 

It was built in 1845 and was added to the National Register of Historic Places on July 23, 2004. It is one of the oldest houses in Oregon and is currently operated as a bed and breakfast.

See also
List of the oldest buildings in Oregon

References

		
National Register of Historic Places in Marion County, Oregon
Buildings and structures completed in 1845